The 1999 Arkansas Razorbacks football team represented the University of Arkansas during the 1999 NCAA Division I-A football season.

Arkansas won the 2000 Cotton Bowl vs the Texas Longhorns on New Year's Day. It was the first college football game to kickoff in the 21st Century. It was also Arkansas' first bowl victory since the 1985 Holiday Bowl, and the Razorbacks first Cotton Bowl win since the 1976 Cotton Bowl Classic. Freshman running back Cedric Cobbs was named the Cotton Bowl offensive MVP, and senior defensive lineman D.J. Cooper was named the game's defensive MVP. Senior quarterback Clint Stoerner became the school's all-time leading passer in most passing categories. Stoerner also redeemed himself versus Tennessee, after fumbling away the ball late in the game in Knoxville in 1998. That fumble led to a Tennessee touchdown that won the game, 28–24. This season, Stoerner threw the game-winning touchdown pass to Anthony Lucas late in the fourth quarter versus the Volunteers in Fayetteville, leading Arkansas to a victory by the same score, 28–24. Razorback fans tore down the goal posts after the win, and carried them to Dickson Street in downtown Fayetteville in celebration. It is considered one of the most memorable games in Razorback football history.

Schedule

Roster

Rankings

1990–1999 statistical leaders

In 1998, Anthony Lucas caught 43 passes for a school-record 1,004 yards receiving. He was the first player in school history to have over 1,000 yards receiving in a single season. His record has since been eclipsed three times (Jarius Wright in 2011, Cobi Hamilton in 2012, Treylon Burks in 2021).

References

Arkansas
Arkansas Razorbacks football seasons
Cotton Bowl Classic champion seasons
Arkansas Razorbacks football